Josvainiai (formerly Josvainiai Bobiliai) is a village in Kėdainiai district municipality, in Kaunas County, in central Lithuania. According to the 2011 census, the village had a population of 55 people. It covers an area next to the northwestern limit of Josvainiai town, nearby the Josvainiai Forest. There are nursery garden, petrol station, some agriculture companies.

Between 1950s and 1970s there were two villages, Josvainiai I (Josvainiai 1st) and Josvainiai II (Josvainiai 2nd).

Demography

References

Villages in Kaunas County
Kėdainiai District Municipality